Tala'ea El Gaish Sporting Club (Translated: “Army Vanguard”), is an Egyptian sports club based in Cairo, Egypt. The club is mainly known for its professional football team, which currently plays in the Egyptian Premier League, the highest league in the Egyptian football league system.

The club also has a representative basketball team that competes in the Egyptian Basketball Super League.

Honours

National
Egypt Cup
Runners-up: 2019–20

Egyptian Super Cup
Winners: 2020–21

Current squad

Managers
 Talaat Youssef (July 1, 2006 – June 30, 2008)
 Farouk Gaafar (Jan 10, 2008 – Jan 5, 2013)
 Emad Soliman (Feb 16, 2013 – Feb 14, 2014)
 Helmy Toulan (March 12, 2014 – June 18, 2014)
 Ahmed Samy (interim) (June 18, 2014 – Jul 20, 2014)
 Anwar Salama (Aug 17, 2014–)
 Tarek Yehia (12 November 2019 – 19 January 2020)
 Abdul-Hamid Bassiouny (19 January 2020 – 3 November 2020)
 Tarek El Ashry (3 November 2020 – 31 August 2022)
 Alaa Abdel Aal (31 August 2022 – 2 November 2022)
 Mohamed Youssef (3 November 2022 – Present)

Other departments

Basketball
The club is currently active in the Egyptian Super League

Handball
The club is currently active in the Egyptian Professional League

Honors
Egyptian Professional League: 2007
Egypt Cup runners-up: 2013, 2018, 2019

Volleyball
The club is currently active in the Egyptian Men's Volleyball League

Honors
: 2015–16, 2016–17
Egypt Cup: 2014–15, 2016–17
African Clubs Championship: 2016
Arab Clubs Championship runners-up: 2015

References

 
Association football clubs established in 1997
1997 establishments in Egypt
Football clubs in Cairo
Military association football clubs